Glyphidocera recticostella is a moth in the family Autostichidae. It was described by Walsingham in 1897. It is found in the West Indies, where it has been recorded from Grenada.

The wingspan is 23–25 mm. The forewings are greyish fuscous with a slight purplish tinge and a very faint indication of a dark spot at the end of the cell. The hindwings are greyish brown.

References

Moths described in 1897
Glyphidocerinae